Shweta Khadka is a Nepalese film actress, producer, politician and entrepreneur known for her works in Nepali cinema. She was born on 5 February 1988 at Panauti municipality of Kavrepalanchok District.

Personal life 
On 7 July 2014, Shweta Khadka married her frequent co-star Shree Krishna Shrestha and after a month on 10 August Shrestha died due to pneumonia and bone cancer at the age of 47. On 7 December 2020, she married Bijayendra Singh.

Political life 
Khadka is the member of the largest and oldest democratic party of Nepal, the Nepali Congress.

Career 
In 2008, Khadka debuted as an actor from Kaha Bhetiyela opposite Shree Krishna Shrestha. The film was a massive blockbuster at the box office. The film went on to become the highest grossing film of the year and ine of the highest grossing film of all time. After Kohinoor, she starred in Hasideu Ek Phera (2010) opposite Hari Bansa Acharya, Madan Krishna Shrestha and Raj Ballav Koirala which was an average success. Her next film Shreeman Shreemati (2011) opposite Shree Krishna Shrestha, Rekha Thapa was not commercially successful. In 2014 she starred in Kohinoor (2014) opposite her then husband Shree Krishna Shrestha. But tragedy struck her life as the Shrestha died of pneumonia and bone cancer. Many Nepalese audience flocked to the theatre to see their star for one final time onscreen. The film went to break all records at the box office and went on to become the highest grossing film ever in history of Nepalese Cinema. After a 4 year gap from film industry she returned as a producer and actresss in movie Kanchhi (2018). The film co-starred Dayahang Rai and was directed by Aakash Adhikari who also  Kohinoor. The film was a huge commercial as well..

References

External links 

 

Living people
Nepalese female models
Nepalese film actresses
21st-century Nepalese actresses
Year of birth missing (living people)
Actors from Kathmandu
Nepali Congress politicians from Bagmati Province
Nepalese actor-politicians